Bernard James Miles, Baron Miles, CBE (27 September 190714 June 1991) was an English character actor, writer and director. He opened the Mermaid Theatre in London in 1959, the first new theatre that opened in the City of London since the 17th century.

He was known for playing character roles that usually had bucolic backgrounds or links to countrymen. His strong accent was typical of rustic dialects associated with the counties of Hertfordshire and Buckinghamshire. His pleasant rolling bass-baritone voice made him a regular presence on the stage and in films for more than fifty years. In addition to his acting, he was a voice-over artist and published author.

Early life
Miles was educated at Uxbridge County School, Pembroke College, Oxford and the Northampton Institute (later City University of London) in London.
He lived for a while in New Road, Hillingdon Heath.

Career
In 1946 his comedy about the Home Guard Let Tyrants Tremble! was staged at the Scala Theatre in the West End, with Miles in the cast.

By the 1950s, he had started to work in television. In 1951 he played Long John Silver in a British TV version of Treasure Island. A decade later he reprised the role for a performance of Treasure Island at the Mermaid Theatre in the winter of 1961–62, where the cast included Spike Milligan as Ben Gunn.

Miles was always keen to promote up-and-coming talent. Impressed with the writing of English playwright John Antrobus, he introduced him to Spike Milligan, which led to the production of the one-act play The Bed Sitting Room. It was later expanded and staged by Miles at Mermaid Theatre on 31 January 1963, with critical and commercial success.

Miles was also known for his comic monologues, often delivered with a rural dialect, which were issued on record albums.

Personal life

Miles married the actress Josephine Wilson, with whom he had two daughters and one son, the racing driver John Miles, in 1931. She co-founded and was involved actively with Miles in the Mermaid Theatre. She predeceased him on 7 November 1990.

Miles was made a Commander of the Order of the British Empire (CBE) in 1953, was knighted in 1969, and was created a life peer as Baron Miles, of Blackfriars in the City of London, on 7 February 1979. He was only the second British actor to receive a peerage, after Laurence Olivier.

Death
Miles survived his wife by six months and died in June 1991. He had been born in the same year, and died on the same day, as the actress Peggy Ashcroft.

Filmography

Film

Channel Crossing (1933) – Passenger (uncredited)
The Love Test (1935) – Allan
The Guv'nor (1935) – Man at Meeting (uncredited)
Late Extra (1935) – Charlie (uncredited)
Twelve Good Men (1936) – Inspector Pine
Everything Is Thunder (1936) – British Officer (uncredited)
Crown v. Stevens (1936) – Detective Wells (uncredited)
Midnight at Madame Tussaud's (1936) – Modeller (Kelvin) (uncredited)
Strange Boarders (1938) – Chemist (uncredited)
The Challenge (1938) – Villager (uncredited)
Convict 99 (1938) – Prison Warder (uncredited)
13 Men and a Gun (1938) – Schultz
The Citadel (1938) – Member of Medical Aid Society Committee (uncredited)
They Drive by Night (1938) – Detective at Billiard Hall (uncredited)
The Rebel Son (1938) – Polish Prisoner
The Spy in Black (1939) – Hans – Hotel Receptionist (uncredited)
The Lion Has Wings (1939) – Civilian Observer Controller
Band Waggon (1940) – Saboteur (uncredited)
Contraband (1940) – Man Lighting Pipe (uncredited)
Pastor Hall (1940) – Heinrich Degan
Freedom Radio (1941) – Capt. Muller
Quiet Wedding (1941) – PC
The Common Touch (1941) – Cricket Steward
The Big Blockade (1942) – Royal Navy: Mate
This Was Paris (1942) – Nazi Propaganda Officer
One of Our Aircraft Is Missing (1942) – Geoff Hickman – Front Gunner in B for Bertie
The Day Will Dawn (1942) – McAllister (Irish Soldier)
The First of the Few (1942) – Lady Houston's Agent (uncredited)
In Which We Serve (1942) – Chief Petty Officer Walter Hardy
The New Lot (1943) – Ted Loman (uncredited)
Tunisian Victory (1944) – British soldier (voice)
Tawny Pipit (1944) – Colonel Barton-Barrington
Carnival (1946) – Trewhella
Great Expectations (1946) – Joe Gargery
Nicholas Nickleby (1947) – Newman Noggs
Fame Is the Spur (1947) – Tom Hannaway
The Guinea Pig (1948) – Mr. Read
Chance of a Lifetime (1950) – Stevens
The Magic Box (1951) – Cousin Alfred
Never Let Me Go (1953) – Joe Brooks
The Man Who Knew Too Much (1956) – Edward Drayton
Moby Dick (1956) – The Manxman
Tiger in the Smoke (1956) – Tiddy Doll the Gang Leader
Fortune Is a Woman (1957) – Mr. Jerome
Doctor at Large (1957) – Haymaking Farmer (uncredited)
The Smallest Show on Earth (1957) – Old Tom
Saint Joan (1957) – Master Executioner
Tom Thumb (1958) – Jonathan
Sapphire (1959) – Ted Harris
Heavens Above! (1963) – Simpson
Baby Love (1968) – (voice)
Run Wild, Run Free (1969) – Reg
The Lady and the Highwayman (1989, TV Movie) – Judge

Television
Nathaniel Titlark (1956–1957, Woodsman, 10 Episodes, BBCTV. Lost) (with Maureen Pryor as Jessie Titlark) – Nathaniel Titlark
Long-running ITV commercial advertisement (1960s) Himself, drinking and recommending Mackeson as a beverage that 'Looks good, tastes good and, by golly, does you good'. Popularly believed to have been the main financial support for the Mermaid Theatre, for many years.

Publications
The British Theatre
God's Brainwave
Favourite Tales from Shakespeare

References

External links

 
   Bernard Miles performances listed at The Theatre Collection, University of Bristol

1907 births
1991 deaths
20th-century English male actors
Actors awarded British peerages
Actors awarded knighthoods
Alumni of Pembroke College, Oxford
Commanders of the Order of the British Empire
English male film actors
English male stage actors
English male television actors
Knights Bachelor
Life peers
People from Uxbridge
Life peers created by Elizabeth II